Psylliodes is a large genus of flea beetles in the family Chrysomelidae. There are about 200 described species worldwide.

Selected species
 Psylliodes affinis (Paykull, 1799) (potato flea beetle)
 Psylliodes chalcomera (Illiger, 1807)
 Psylliodes chrysocephala (Linnaeus, 1758) (cabbage stem flea beetle)
 Psylliodes convexior J. L. LeConte, 1857 (hop flea beetle)
 Psylliodes credens Fall, 1933
 Psylliodes cucullatus (Illiger, 1807)
 Psylliodes elegans Horn, 1889
 Psylliodes guatemalensis Jacoby, 1885
 Psylliodes luteolus (Müller, 1776)
 Psylliodes napi (Fabricius, 1792)
 Psylliodes picinus (Marsham, 1802)
 Psylliodes punctulatus F. E. Melsheimer, 1847  (hop flea beetle)
 Psylliodes sublaevis Horn, 1889
 Psylliodes verisimilis Fall, 1933

Gallery

References

Alticini
Chrysomelidae genera
Taxa named by Pierre André Latreille